Marcus Amaker (born October 29, 1976 in Las Vegas, Nevada) is the poet laureate of Charleston, South Carolina. In 2021, he was named an Academy of American Poets Fellow. He has eight published books. His poetry has been recognized by The Kennedy Center, Washington National Opera, The Portland Opera, Button Poetry, NPR, Washington Post, PBS Newshour, TEDx, Huffington Post, Charleston Magazine, Post and Courier, Charleston City Paper, Charleston Art Mag, Charleston Regional Business Journal, North Dakota Quarterly, South Carolina Public Radio, and more

Amaker was named Charleston, South Carolina’s first poet laureate by Mayor John Tecklenburg in 2016. He was also named the artist-in-residence of the Gaillard Center in 2019 and an Academy of American Poets Fellow in 2021.

In addition to poetry, Amaker is a graphic designer, web designer, videographer and musician. He is the lead graphic designer for the national music journal No Depression.

As a musician, he has released more than 30 albums under the alias tape loop. He's also released two albums with Grammy-nominated drummer/producer Quentin E. Baxter of Ranky Tanky.

Early life and education 
Amaker graduated from the University of South Carolina in 1999. He graduated with a bachelor's degree in Journalism. After graduation, he worked at The Anderson Independent-Mail. He later moved to Charleston in 2003 to work as a graphic designer at the Post and Courier. While at the Post and Courier, he became editor of Preview and Charleston Scene, the paper’s entertainment sections.

Poet laureateship and mentorship 
Marcus Amaker and Marjory Wentworth read at Mayor John Tecklenburg’s inauguration, in 2016. Shortly thereafter, Tecklenburg named Amaker Charleston, South Carolina’s first poet laureate. Amaker frequently visits schools to lead poetry workshops with students. Amaker was asked to compose a poem for the removal of the John C. Calhoun statue in June, 2020.

Awards and honors 
 Charleston, South Carolina poet laureate (2016–present)
Gaillard Center artist-in-residence (2019–present)
Fresh Voice in the Humanities arts award from South Carolina Humanities
 South Carolina Press Association, 2005: Second Place in page design (daily division, over 80,000)
 South Carolina Press Association, 2007: First Place in page design (daily division, over 80,000)
 South Carolina Press Association, 2008: First Place in feature page design (daily division, over 80,000); First Place in entertainment section (all daily division)
 South Carolina Press Association, 2009: Second Place in page design (daily division, over 80,000); Third Place in illustrations (daily division, over 80,000)
 South Carolina Press Association, 2010: Second Place in entertainment section (daily division, over 80,000); Third Place in inside page design (daily division, over 80,000)

Poetry books 
 Black Music Is. 2021. Free Verse Press. ISBN 978-1-7374696-0-5
The Birth of All Things. 2020. Free Verse Press. 
 Empath. 2018. Createspace. 
Mantra: an interactive poetry book (second edition). 2016. Createspace 
 the spoken word: selected poems: 2003-2013. 2013. Createspace. 
 the present presence. 2012. Createspace. 
 The Soft Paper Cut: poetry and art by marcus amaker. 2007. Organic Process, LLC. 
 poems for augustine. 2005. Createspace. 
 listening to static: poetry and graphic art. 2005. Booksurge.

Music 

 Big Butt (1986) - self-released cassette
 gimme some (1987) - self-released cassette 
 Play It (1988) - self-released cassette
 Say No! (1988) - self-released cassette
 Daydreaming' (1988) - self-released cassette
 All uv the Time (1989) - self-released cassette
 Minimalism (2005) - electronic music, released as tape loop
 Dealate (2005) - electronic music, released as tape loop
 escapism (2006) - electronic music, released as tape loop
 1945 (2008) - electronic music, released as tape loop
 lady phoenix (2009) - electronic music, released as tape loop
 Digital Detox (2010) - electronic music, released as tape loop
 the cassette demos (2011) - electronic music, released as tape loop
 Sunday Rain (2011)
 animation (2012) - electronic music, released as tape loop
 The New Foundation (2015) - with Quentin E. Baxter. Poetry and jazz
 the drum machine, part 1 (2015) - electronic music, released as tape loop
 analogue 1-6 (2016-2017) - electronic music, released as tape loop
 open (2018) - electronic music, released as tape loop
 empath (2018) - with Quentin E. Baxter. Poetry and jazz
 empath (variations) (2018) - electronic music, released as tape loop
 creating empty space (2019) - electronic music, released as tape loop
 the birth of all things (2019) - electronic music, released as tape loop
 the weight that holds the animal (2019) - electronic music, released as tape loop
 contagion (2020) - electronic music, released as tape loop
 rhythm vaccine (2020) - electronic music, released as tape loop
subversive (2021) - electronic music, released as tape loop

Personal life 
Marcus was born in Las Vegas, Nevada to Betty and Willie Amaker, who were stationed there because of the Air Force. The family moved to England, Maryland, Japan and Texas before moving to South Carolina. Marcus' family is from Orangeburg, South Carolina. In 2015, Marcus married Jordan Freeman in Charleston, South Carolina. His daughter, Rei Amaker, was born in late 2019.

References 

1976 births
Living people
Poets from South Carolina
Writers from Charleston, South Carolina
University of South Carolina alumni
21st-century American poets
American electronic musicians
American graphic designers
American male poets
21st-century American male writers
21st-century American musicians
21st-century American male musicians
Writers from Las Vegas
Poets from Nevada
Musicians from Las Vegas
Musicians from Charleston, South Carolina